Baryancistrus xanthellus is a species of armored catfish endemic to Brazil.  It is a benthic fresh water fish that lives in the Volta Grande and Xingu River, as well as the area immediately above Belo Monte falls and the Iriri River. It reaches a length of  SL.

References

Ancistrini
Fish of South America
Fish of Brazil
Endemic fauna of Brazil
Fish described in 2011